George Bernard Harris (August 16, 1901 – October 18, 1983) was a United States district judge of the United States District Court for the Northern District of California.

Education and career

Born in San Francisco, California, Harris received a Bachelor of Laws from the St. Ignatius College School of Law (now the University of San Francisco School of Law) in 1926. He was in private practice in San Francisco from 1926 to 1941. He was a Judge of the San Francisco Municipal Court from 1941 to 1946.

Federal judicial service

On June 18, 1946, Harris was nominated by President Harry S. Truman to a new seat on the United States District Court for the Northern District of California created by 60 Stat. 260. He was confirmed by the United States Senate on June 29, 1946, and received his commission on July 9, 1946. He served as Chief Judge from 1961 to 1970, assuming senior status on July 31, 1970. Harris served in that capacity until his death on October 18, 1983.

References

Sources
 

1901 births
1983 deaths
California state court judges
University of San Francisco alumni
Judges of the United States District Court for the Northern District of California
United States district court judges appointed by Harry S. Truman
20th-century American judges
20th-century American lawyers